Oak Grove is an unincorporated community in Hardin County, Tennessee. Oak Grove is located north of Savannah and is near the east bank of the Tennessee River.

References

Unincorporated communities in Hardin County, Tennessee
Unincorporated communities in Tennessee
Tennessee populated places on the Tennessee River